Rose Françoise Carpentier called Madame Gonthier 7 December 1829, was a French actress and lyrical artist.

Life 
Born in Metz, her aptitude for theatrical arts is said to have been apparent from childhood, and a few society successes prove her aptitude for comic roles. She played in the provinces and in Brussels from 1771 to 1777. She was a member of the Prince
Prince Charles Alexander of Lorraine's company at theatre La Monnaie.

She made her debut in 1778, as a boarder at the Comédie-Italienne . At the beginning, she played the soubrettes, but while still young, she devoted herself to playing the duègnes and the old peasant women. She played on 18 March of the same year, Simone in Le sorcier by Philidor, then the mother Bobi, in Rose et Colas by Monsigny, and Alix, in Les trois fermiers by Dezède.

In 1779, she was admitted as a member of the Comédie-Italienne. She successively played comedy and comic opera. Her appearance at the théâtre de la salle Favart in 1783 was marked by triumphs. She left this theatre following a dispute with the management and in 1793 she signed a contract with the théâtre de la République but Madame Gonthier was not there "in her sphere". She played in Lille in 1798–1799.

In 1801, she was a member of the new society of actors of the Théâtre national de l'Opéra-Comique.

Among the many creations that mark her career, Alix from Blaise et Babet by Dezède (1783), Perrette in Fanfan et Colas (1784), Babet in Philippe et Georgette (1791), the old peasant in Adèle et Dorsan (1795), Madame Bernard in Marianne, Mopsa from The judgment of Midas.

In 1807, a performance for her benefit was given at the Paris Opera in the presence of the empress Joséphine de Beauharnais.

She said goodbye to the Opéra-Comique in 1812.

Private 
She married Charles-Adrien Gontier, an actor in Brussels then in Versailles, and in second marriage François Allaire (†1828), coryphée of the Opéra-Comique, in 1798.

Selon Sainte-Beuve, she is said to have had a romantic relationship with Florian in 1778 and inspired the character of Estelle in Estelle et Némorin by Henri-Joseph Rigel (1788).

Creation 
 1783 : Blaise et Babet by Nicolas Dezède, role of Alix
 1784 : Fanfan et Colas ou les frères de lait, one-act comedy by Madame de Beaunoir, création à la Comédie-Italienne, 7 September
 1789 : Le Tuteur célibataire, comedy in one act by M. Desforges, first performed at the Comédie-Italienne on 17 November
 1790 : Pierre le Grand, opéra-comique by André Grétry, libretto by Jean-Nicolas Bouilly, 13 January, part of Geneviève
 1790: Le Chêne patriotique ou la matinée du 14 juillet, two acts libertto by Daleyrac, libretto by Boutet de Monvel, music creation at Comédie-Italienne, 10 July, role of Madame Alerte
 1791: Philippe et Georgette, libretto by Jacques-Marie Boutet de Monvel, music by Nicolas Dalayrac premiere at the Comédie-Italienne, 28 December part of Babet.
 1795: Adèle et Dorsan by Nicolas Dalayrac part of the old peasant.
 1796: Le Mariage de la veille, one-act comedy, libretto by Charles-Joseph Loeillard d'Avrigny; music by Louis Emmanuel Jadin, creation at the Opéra-Comique 2 January
 1797: Le jeune Henri, opéra by Mehul, created at Théâtre Favart, 1 May, part of Christine
 1797: Ponce de Léon, Opéra bouffe in 3 acts by Henri-Montan Berton, creation 15 March at the Opéra-Comique, part of Miss Dalmanchinaros.
 1798 : Primerose, 3-act opera; libretto by Favières and Morel de Vendée; music by Daleyrac, creation at the Opéra-Comique 7 March.
 1799: Le Général suédois, opéra-comique, 23 May.
 1800: Vadé chez lui, comedy in one act by Jacques Benoît Demautort, created at the Opéra-Comique, 4 August
 1802: Lysistrata, comedy in one act, mixed with vaudeville, libretto by François-Benoît Hoffman, creation at the Opéra-Comique, 16 January
 1802: L'Antichambre, ou les Valets chez eux, opéra comique, in one act, libretto by Emmanuel Dupaty, music by Nicolas Dalayrac, created at the Opéra-Comique, 27 February. modified under a different title : Picaros et Diégo, ou la Folle soirée (3 May 1803).
 1803: Ma tante Aurore, ou le Roman impromptu, opera buffa in two acts, libretto by Longchamps and music by Boieldieu, creation at the Opéra-Comique, 13 January, part of Aurore de Germond.
 1803: Picaros et Diégo, opera buffa en un acte, libretto by Emmanuel Dupaty, music by Nicolas Dalayrac, représenté pour la première fois, à l'Opéra Comique, 3 May, rôle de Dona Barba.
 1804: La jeune prude ou les femmes entre elles, comedy and song in one act, libretto by Emmanuel Dupaty, music by Nicolas Dalayrac, premiered at the Opéra-Comique 14 January.
 1804: La Romance, 1 act opera by Henri-Montan Berton, libretto by Gaugiran-Nanteuil and Claude-François Fillette-Loraux, created at the Opéra-Comique, 26 January, part of Catherine.
 1804: Un quart-d'heure de silence, one-act opera, libretto by P. Guillet, music by Pierre Gaveaux, created at theOpéra-Comique, 9 June.
 1806: Les Maris garçons, one-act opera; libretto by Gaugiran-Nanteuil, music by Henri-Montan Berton, created at the Opéra-Comique, 14 July, part of Mme Dugrand<.
 1808 : Anna, ou les Deux Chaumieres, one-act opera, libretto Sewrin, music by Solié ; craation at the Opéra-Comique 20 February.
 24 February 1809: Avis aux Jaloux , ou la Rencontre Imprévue, opéra-comique in one act, libretto by René de Chazet and Jean-Baptiste Dubois, music by Louis Alexandre Piccinni, creation at the Opéra-Comique (Salle Feydeau) 25 Octobre, part of Marceline
 1811, Le charme de la voix, one-act opera, libretto by Gaugiran-Nanteuil and Julliette-Loraux, music by Henri-Montan Berton, created at the Opéra-Comique (Salle Feydeau), 24 January.

Notes and references 
Notes

Further reading 

.
.
.
.
.

External links 

1747 births
1829 deaths
Actors from Metz
19th-century French opera singers
18th-century French actresses
19th-century French actresses
Burials at Montmartre Cemetery